Greatest Hitz is a compilation album by American rap rock band Limp Bizkit. Released in 2005, it is a retrospective compiling material from the band's albums Three Dollar Bill, Yall$, Significant Other, Chocolate Starfish and the Hot Dog Flavored Water and Results May Vary.

Production and content 

Greatest Hitz was announced for release as early as 2001. While recording the albums Results May Vary and The Unquestionable Truth (Part 1), the band continued to work on the compilation. A companion DVD, Greatest Videoz, was also released.

Greatest Hitz contains material from the band's albums Three Dollar Bill, Yall$, Significant Other, Chocolate Starfish and the Hot Dog Flavored Water and Results May Vary, as well as previously unreleased tracks and a new song entitled "Home Sweet Home/Bittersweet Symphony", a medley of "Home Sweet Home" by Mötley Crüe and "Bitter Sweet Symphony" by The Verve.

Reception 

Greatest Hitz peaked at number 47 on the Billboard 200. AllMusic's Stephen Thomas Erlewine said, "None of [Greatest Hitz] has aged well – as a matter of fact, it's aged incredibly quickly, sounding older than alt-rock hits from the mid-'90s – but that's almost beside the point, because this does its job well, and listeners who want to have some Limp Bizkit in their collection will find this to provide them with more of what they want than any other Bizkit dizc." In The Essential Rock Discography, Martin Charles Strong gave the compilation a 7 out of 10 rating.  the album has sold over 3,500,000 copies worldwide, including 750,000 in the US.

Track listing

Personnel 

Tracks 1–11

 Fred Durst – vocals
 Wes Borland – guitars
 DJ Lethal – turntables, samples, keyboards, programming, sound development
 John Otto – drums, percussion
 Sam Rivers – bass guitar

Tracks 12–17

Fred Durst – vocals, guitar
Mike Smith – guitar
Randy Pereira – guitar on "Behind Blue Eyes"
Brian Welch – guitar on "Build a Bridge"
Sam Rivers – bass guitar
John Otto – drums, percussion
DJ Lethal  – turntables, keyboards, samples, programming, sound development

References 

2005 greatest hits albums
Limp Bizkit compilation albums
Flip Records (1994) albums
Geffen Records compilation albums
Albums produced by Rick Rubin